In 2016, NASCAR sanctioned three national series, and six touring series.

National series
 2016 NASCAR Sprint Cup Series – The top racing series in NASCAR
 2016 NASCAR Xfinity Series – The second-highest racing series in NASCAR
 2016 NASCAR Camping World Truck Series – The third-highest racing series in NASCAR

Touring series
 2016 NASCAR K&N Pro Series West – One of the two K&N Pro Series
 2016 NASCAR K&N Pro Series East – One of the two K&N Pro Series
 2016 NASCAR Whelen Modified Tour – One of the two modified tours in NASCAR
 2016 NASCAR Whelen Southern Modified Tour – One of the two modified tours in NASCAR
 2016 NASCAR Pinty's Series – The top NASCAR racing series in Canada

 2016 NASCAR Whelen Euro Series – The top NASCAR racing series in Europe

 
NASCAR seasons